Minor league baseball teams were based in Arkansas City, Kansas in various seasons between 1887 and 1926. Arkansas City teams played as members of the Kansas State League in 1887 and 1909 to 1910 and the Southwestern League from 1924 to 1926.

History
Minor league baseball in Arkansas City, Kansas, began in the 1887 season. The Arkansas City team played as members of the six–team Independent level Kansas State League, which reduced to four teams during the season. Arkansas City placed 2nd in the league standings with a record of 19–20, playing under managers W.F. Wingate, Billy Hunter and Luke Short. Arkansas City finished 3.0 games behind the 1st place Wellington Browns in the final standings. The Kansas State League did not return to play the 1888 season.

In 1909, the Arkansas City-Winfield Twins resumed play in the Kansas State League and in partnership with nearby Winfield, Kansas. The "Twins" became members of the reformed eight–team Class D level Kansas State League. Arkansas City-Winfield joined the Great Bend Millers, Hutchinson Salt Packers, Larned Cowboys, Lyons Lions, McPherson Merry Macks, Newton Railroaders and Wellington Dukes as 1909 league members.

In 1909 Kansas State League play, the Arkansas City-Winfield Twins placed 7th in the 1909 standings. The Twins finished with a 41–56 overall record to end the season in 7th place in the eight–team league. Playing under managers M.E. Parks, Frank Layne and Bennie Owens, the Twins finished 19.5 games behind the 1st place Lyons Lions in the final Kansas State League standings.

Continuing play as members of the 1910 Kansas State League, the Arkansas City Grays finished the season in last place. The Grays ended the season with a record of 40–67 to finish in 8th place. The team was managed by Roy Baker, Billy Hunter, L. Evans and M.E. Parks. The Grays finished 29.0 games behind the 1st place Hutchinson Salt Packers in the final 1910 standings of the eight–team league.

In 1924, Arkansas City returned to minor league play as members of the 1924 Class D level Southwestern League and the Arkansas City "Osages" won the league championship. Arkansas City joined the Coffeyville Refiners, Emporia Traders, Enid Harvesters, Eureka Oilers, Independence Producers, Newton Railroaders and Salina Millers in league play. Finishing with a regular season record of 70–61, the Osages placed 3rd, playing under managers Rube Geyer and Ed Yuna. Fuzzy Hufft of Arkansas City led the league with 28 home runs and a .367 batting average. In the playoff Finals, the Arkansas City Osages defeated the Newton Railroaders 4 gamed to 3 to capture the Southwestern League championship.

The Arkansas City use of the "Osages" moniker corresponds to local history, geography and business. Located in the Osage region, the city became host to the Osage Hotel in 1920. The hotel building is located at 100 North Summit Street, Arkansas City, Kansas.

Continuing play in the 1925 Southwestern League, the Arkansas City Osages placed 3rd in the final standings, missing the playoffs. With a regular season record of 65–63, playing under manager Ed Yuna 1925, Arkansas City finished 8.0 games behind the 1st place Salina Millers. Player/manager Ed Yuna led the Southwestern League with 28 home runs and 205 total hits.

The Arkansas City Osages played their final season in 1926 as the Southwestern League reduced to six teams. The Osages placed 4th with a record of 54–62. Playing under managers Russ McMullan and Zuidal Zunigha, Arkansas City ended their final season 21.5 games behind the 1st place Salina Millers in the league standings. The Southwestern League folded following the 1926 season.

Arkansas City, Kansas, has not hosted another minor league team.

The ballparks
In 1909 and 1910, Arkansas City minor league teams were noted to have played home games at Association Park. The reported capacity of Association Park was 700–1,000, with
every Wednesday serving as Ladies Day.

The Arkansas City Osages of 1924 to 1926 hosted played home minor league games at League Park. It was noted games had 2:30 P.M. start on Saturday and Sunday games and 4:15 P.M. for weekday contests. The location was reported to be on East Kansas Street, near North Summit Street, Arkansas City, Arkansas.

Timeline

Year–by–year records

Notable alumni

Roy Evans (1910)
Jack Rothrock (1925)
Joe Sprinz (1926)
Yats Wuestling (1909)

See also
Arkansas City Osages playersArkansas City Grays players

References

External links
 Baseball Reference

Cowley County, Kansas